Rubicon is an unincorporated community located in the town of Rubicon, Dodge County, Wisconsin, United States. Rubicon has a post office with ZIP code 53078.

References

External links
 Sanborn fire insurance maps: 1894 1900 1912

Unincorporated communities in Dodge County, Wisconsin
Unincorporated communities in Wisconsin